The Tagula honeyeater (Microptilotis vicina) is a species of bird in the family Meliphagidae. It is endemic to Papua New Guinea.

References

Birds of Papua New Guinea
Microptilotis
Birds described in 1912
Taxonomy articles created by Polbot